Nipponites is an extinct genus of heteromorph ammonites.  The shells of Nipponites (primarily N. mirabilis) form "ox-bow" bends, resulting in some of the most bizarre shapes seen among ammonites.

The ecology of Nipponites, as with many other nostoceratids, is subject to much speculation.

Distribution
Fossils of most species are found primarily in Upper Cretaceous strata of Japan.  N. mirabilis is found in Coniacian-aged strata of Japan and possibly Turonian-aged strata in Madagascar.  N. bacchus is found in Upper Cretaceous Hokkaido.  Two species are found exclusively outside Japan, N. sachalinensis, which is found in Upper Cretaceous strata of Sakhalin island, and Kamchatka peninsula, and N. occidentalis, which is known from two shells found in the Turonian-aged Hornbrook Formation of Southern Oregon.

Image gallery

References
Notes

Bibliography

Ammonitida genera
Nostoceratidae
Cretaceous ammonites
Ammonites of Asia
Ammonites of Africa
Prehistoric animals of Madagascar
Turonian genus first appearances
Coniacian genus extinctions
Fossil taxa described in 1902